Everything So Far is the first compilation album by American rock band Pinegrove. It was initially self-released by the band in 2014, and later released on cassette as a tour-only exclusive by Seagreen Records in December 2014. Everything So Far serves as an anthology the band's early material, from self-released extended plays to the band's first proper album, Meridian (originally released in 2012). Following Pinegrove's signing to independent record label Run for Cover, it was re-released with updated cover art on October 9, 2015. It has since seen re-released on vinyl and compact disc.

Background
Pinegrove first issued Everything So Far in 2014. The first edition was a self-released burned CD-R with hand-drawn artwork on each disc, as well as unique cardboard sleeves coated with acrylic paint. The track listing was updated with an additional song, the newly-recorded "Problems", for its December 2014 release on Boston-based cassette label Seagreen, and copies were sold on tour dates during that period. In 2015, Pinegrove signed to Run for Cover, which re-released Everything So Far in October of that year with an altered track listing. In 2017, they re-released it for the first time on vinyl and compact disc, including a 16-page booklet featuring lyrics, photos, and an introductory note by frontman Evan Stephens Hall.

Reception

Gwilym Mumford at The Guardian considered it a nice introduction to the group, commenting, "As with such completist compilations there’s a fair chunk of filler here, and over time its 21 songs begin to congeal into each other a shade, but as an introduction to the band’s many charms, it’s solid enough." Timothy Monger at Allmusic said that "Ranging from lo-fi rock epics to strummed acoustic numbers that blend lonesome rural tones with desperate suburban ennui, Everything So Far is a testament to a band that sounded original out of the gate."

Track listing

Personnel
Adapted from Everything So Far liner notes.

Pinegrove
Evan Stephens Hall – guitar, vocals, percussion, cover design, mixing, photography
Nick Levine – guitar, bass guitar, banjo, cover design, mixing, photography
Sam Skinner – bass guitar, keyboards, mixing, photography, mastering on tracks 2 to 7
Zack Levine – drums, percussion, mixing, photography
Nandi Rose Plunkett – vocals, photography
Adan Carlo – bass guitar, photography

Additional musicians
Jane McKendry – additional vocals on "Days"
Production
Bryan Dubay – additional photography
Kayla Tamney – additional photography
Lyndsey Matoushek – additional photography
Doug Hall – mastering on "Days" and "On Jet Lag", additional vocals on "Days"
Greg Calbi – mastering on "New Friends"
Steve Fallone – additional mastering on "New Friends"
Steve Skinner – mastering on tracks 8 to 19

References

External links

Everything So Far at YouTube (streamed copy where licensed)

Pinegrove (band) albums
Run for Cover Records albums
2014 compilation albums